San Casciano dei Bagni is a comune (municipality) in the Province of Siena in the Italian region of Tuscany, located about  southeast of Florence and about  southeast of Siena.

Geography 

San Casciano dei Bagni borders the following municipalities: Abbadia San Salvatore, Acquapendente, Allerona, Cetona, Città della Pieve, Fabro, Piancastagnaio, Proceno, Radicofani, Sarteano.

A destination for travelers during ancient times, San Casciano dei Bagni is a member of a group of communities that are identified to modern tourists as the "prettiest Italian villages" (borghi piu belli d'Italia).

History 

According to legends related by sources such as Livy, the thermal baths of Balnea Clusina were founded by Porsenna, an Etruscan king of Chiusi who Roman sources date to the sixth century BC. The baths also were popular during the ensuing Roman era, Augustus being said to have been amongst those using the baths.

In the third to fourth centuries, a Christian Pieve of St. Mary ad balneo existed in San Casciano. 

During the Middle Ages it was initially under Lombard rule, and later under the Visconti di Campiglia and the Abbey of San Salvatore. Troops of San Casciano took part in the Battle of Montaperti in 1260. The last Visconti ruler was Monaldo, who also was podestà of Florence in 1389. 

San Casciano was acquired by the Republic of Siena in 1412. 

In Renaissance times its thermal baths attracted visitors from all over Europe, but visits began to decline in the nineteenth century, recovering only during the early twenty-first century.

Main sights 

Ancient Roman hot baths
Lago di San Casciano

Excavations

In 2022, a trove of 24 bronze Etruscan statues was discovered during archaeological excavations that began in 2019 at the nearby ancient thermal baths. The baths being excavated date from the second century BC, a period of transition from Etruscan to Roman rule. The Etruscan artifacts had decorated an earlier sanctuary that had existed at the site and they were buried in new construction by the Romans, likely in a rededication ritual. 

The statues were covered by approximately 6,000 ancient bronze, silver, and gold coins and the artifacts were in an excellent state of preservation. They were hailed as the most significant archaeological find of their kind in 50 years, as most surviving objects from the period are in terracotta.

The discovery is also considered important since, in the period it covers, several wars were waged yet the statues, which bear inscriptions in both Etruscan and Latin, indicate that Etruscan and Roman families worshipped the statues' deities peacefully together here.

References

External links 

 San Casciano dei Bagni official website

 
Spa towns in Italy
Hilltowns in Tuscany
History of Tuscany